Mahmoud Aboul-Dahab (Arabic محمود أبو الدهب); (born February 23, 1970), is an Egyptian former football defender.

International career

Aboul-Dahab made several appearances for Egypt national football team, including 1996 African Cup of Nations qualification where he scored 4 goals despite being a defender. Later, he missed the 1996 African Cup of Nations due to injury. Aboul-Dahab played his last international game on November 1999 against Ghana under Gérard Gili.

International Goals
Scores and results list Egypt's goal tally first.

Titles and honours

Al Ahly
 Egyptian League (3):  1994–1995, 1995–1996, 1996–1997
 Egypt Cup (1):  1995–1996

External links

References

1970 births
Living people
Egyptian footballers
Egypt international footballers
Egyptian expatriate footballers
Egyptian expatriate sportspeople in Austria
Al Ahly SC players
Egyptian Premier League players
Association football defenders